The Church of the Immacolata Concezione, also called San Fillippo, is a Roman Catholic church, built adjacent to a former Oratorian seminary and convent, located on Via Vittorio Emenuele II number 61 in the town of Chieri, Province of Turin, region of Piedmont, Italy. The seminary is now a museum called Centro Visite Don Bosco.

History
The church's construction began in the 17th century and was not finalized for decades. The architects are unknown; the style is that of Baroque architecture. The interior's main altarpiece was painted by Daniel Seyter. The sacristy has a large canvas by Caraccioli. The main relics of the church are those of St Valentine, represented by a wooden sculpture. In the presbytery is the tomb of Giovanni Comollo, a close friend of Saint Giovanni Bosco. Construction on the adjacent convent-seminary was begun in the 17th century for the Oratorians of San Filippo Neri; the architect was Pietro Angelo Galletti. The building was used as a city hall from 1821 to 1949, when it was given to the Seminary of Turin.

In 2011, a museum, Centro Visite Don Bosco, has exhibits on the life and work of the founder of the Salesian Order, Giovanni Bosco, who studied at the seminary for nearly half a decade starting in 1835.

References

Roman Catholic churches in Chieri
Museums in Piedmont
18th-century Roman Catholic church buildings in Italy
Baroque church buildings in Piedmont
Chieri